This is a list of governors of Mizoram, an Indian state part of Northeast India

Powers and functions

The Governor enjoys many different types of powers:

Executive powers related to administration, appointments and removals,
Legislative powers related to lawmaking and the state legislature, that is Vidhan Sabha or Vidhan Parishad, and
Discretionary powers to be carried out according to the discretion of the Governor.

Before statehood
S.J.Das was the chief commissioner of Mizoram from 21 January 1972 to 23 April 1972. He was followed by these Lieutenant Governors:

Governors of Mizoram

References

External links
 http://mizoram.nic.in/gov/governor.htm

See also
 Governors of India
 Chief Minister of Mizoram

 
Mizoram
Governors